Scott George Bauer (January 11, 1954 – October 24, 2003) was the senior pastor of The Church On The Way from late 1999 until his sudden death in 2003. He also served as the Chairman of the Board of Trustees of the King’s College and Seminary and as the supervisor the Los Angeles North Valley District of Foursquare Churches. On weekdays, he was known for his messages that aired on the KTLW radio program titled Life on the Way.  Before his death, Scott Bauer had finished writing his first book, The New Church On The Way. He helped in the founding the now defunct Los Angeles Community Builders Inc. which battled against neighborhood deterioration and juvenile delinquency.  He is credited with assisting in the founding of the Israel-Christian Nexus with his “encouragement” and “guidance”.

Among Southern California clergy, he was known for bringing Jewish and Christian leaders together.

Biography
Scott Bauer was born in Chicago in 1954 to Bill and Dolores Bauer. Scott Bauer was an associate pastor of the Church On The Way from 1982 to the time when he was named by his father-in-law, church founder, Jack Hayford, as his successor in 1999, upon Hayford's retirement. Under his senior pastoral leadership, Jim Tolle was named as the pastor of La Iglesia En El Camino, the Spanish expression of the church and a theater complex was purchased in Santa Clarita, California which was renovated into a church, The Church On The Way-Santa Clarita, now pastored by Doug Andersen and Jack Hayford's daughter Christa.

Education
Scott Bauer obtained his bachelor’s degree from UCLA, his master’s from Fuller Theological Seminary and a doctorate in ministry from Oral Roberts University.

Family
Bauer married Rebecca Hayford, a daughter of Church On The Way founder Jack Hayford.  Together they had three children (Brian, Kyle, and Lindsey). Bauer's widow, Rebecca Hayford Bauer is a Gold Medallion author who has authored books such as The Spirit Filled Family, Seasons of Praise: A 52 Week worship Celebration for the Entire Family, and Just 25 Days 'Til Christmas. Rebecca Hayford Bauer was married to Scott Bauer for 27 years at the time of his sudden death. Their son Brian is lead pastor at Grace Church in San Marcos California, their second son Kyle was a missionary in Mexico and now pastor for the Spanish speaking congregation at the Church on the Way in Santa Clarita, and their daughter Lindsey is a church planter in Sacramento. In 2008, Rebecca resigned her staff position at The Church on the Way to pursue teaching, writing and other more lucrative endeavors. Currently she administers the “Van Nuys Campus” of The Kings University.

Death
At the conclusion of a “Church Alive!” prayer meeting and worship service on the evening of  Wednesday, October 22, 2003, Scott Bauer a cerebral hemorrhage, causing him to lapse into a coma. He died two days later, on October 24, 2003 in the Northridge Hospital Medical Center, aged 49.

On October 29, 2003, a funeral service was conducted at the Church On the Way with over 6,000 people in attendance.
Rabbi Steven Jacobs, personal friend of Scott Bauer, from Kol Tikvah Congregation in Woodland Hills was  among the mourners, and spoke on behalf of the Jewish community.
Bauer is interred in the Forest Lawn Memorial Park (Glendale) near the Foursquare denomination founder Aimee Semple McPherson and his mother-in-law Anna Hayford.

See also
International Church of the Foursquare Gospel
Jack Hayford
Jim Tolle
Cleansing Stream Ministry

References

External links
The Church On The Way Official Website of the Church On The Way
Cleansing Stream Ministries Discipleship Seminar Teacher
Los Angeles Community Builders Inc. Official Website
Israel-Christian Nexus Israel-Christian Nexus Official Website
"Pastor Puts Energy Into Mentors" Article by the Los Angeles Times
Scott Bauer  Pastor Dudley Rutherford, from Shepherd of the Hills, talking about Scott Bauer in his blogspot
 

1954 births
2003 deaths
People from Chicago
American Christian clergy
Members of the Foursquare Church
American evangelicals
Oral Roberts University alumni
20th-century American clergy
21st-century American clergy
Burials at Forest Lawn Memorial Park (Hollywood Hills)